Tarapita was an Estonian literature group which was active between 1921-1922.

Tarapita has its own newspaper: Tarapita.

Members of Tarapita 
 Albert Kivikas 
 Johannes Semper 
 Marie Under
 Artur Adson
 Johannes Vares-Barbarus
 Friedebert Tuglas
 August Alle
 Jaan Kärner 
 Aleksander Tassa

See also
 Siuru

References

Estonian literature
1921 establishments in Estonia
Literary circles